Sąpolnica  is a village in the administrative district of Gmina Nowogard, within Goleniów County, West Pomeranian Voivodeship, in north-western Poland.

For the history of the region, see history of Pomerania.

References

Villages in Goleniów County